The Government College of Engineering, Kannur (GCEK) is a public engineering institute affiliated to APJ Abdul Kalam Technological University in Kerala,[India. The institute was established in October 1986 by Directorate of Technical Education under the Government of Kerala. In 2012, Careers360, a magazine promoted by Outlook Group, ranked it among the best engineering institutes in Kerala with AA+ rating.

The institute has an annual intake of 330 students (under five four-year graduate courses), on merit basis through the All Kerala Common Entrance Examination. The B.Tech. courses offered are mechanical engineering (60 seats), civil engineering (60 seats), electrical and electronics engineering (60 seats), electronics and communication engineering (90 seats) and computer science and engineering (60 seats).

M.Tech. courses in electrical and electronics engineering (power electronics and drives) and mechanical engineering (advanced manufacturing and mechanical systems) were started from 2011 to 2012 onward and electronics and communication engineering (signal processing and embedded systems) and civil engineering (computer-aided structural engineering) with an annual intake of 72 students.

Courses
The institute was previously affiliated to Kannur University. Since 2015, the institute is affiliated to KTU.

The GCEK offers an M.Tech. degree in engineering in four subjects:

 Advanced manufacturing and mechanical systems design
 Power electronics and drives
 Signal processing and embedded systems
 Computer aided structural engineering

The institute offers B.Tech. Degree in Engineering in five subjects:
 Mechanical
 Civil
 Electrical and electronics
 Electronics and communication
 Computer science

The intake is 335 students per year.

The institute offers PhD.

Departments

Engineering 
 Mechanical Engineering
 Civil Engineering
 Electrical and Electronics Engineering
 Electronics and Communication Engineering
 Computer Science and Engineering

Non-engineering 
 Department of Mathematics
 Department of Physics
 Department of Chemistry
 Department of Economics
 Department of Geology
 Department of Physical Education

Facilities
The institute has seven buses for the conveyance of the staff and students, hostels for men and women, accommodating staff hostel and quarters, a co-operative store, a canteen and recreational facilities. GCEK has a training placement cell for campus recruitment and a Parent-Teacher Association.

Forums, clubs and associations include the Sports and Health club, NSS unit, Guidance and Counselling cell, Nature club, Cultural Center, Alumni association, science forum and IEEE Students Chapter.

Each department has computer labs and a library, besides the central computer lab and library. The institute website and 24-hour high-speed internet connection were inaugurated on 3 October 2002. The ECE department has an electronics fabrication laboratory consisting of laser cutters, 3d printers and accessories where students can do their projects.

History
The foundation stone of the main building was laid by Sri. K. Karunakaran, Chief Minister of Kerala on 7 January 1987 at a function presided over by Sri. T.M. Jacob, Minister for Education. The first building constructed was the science block, inaugurated by Sri. Pacheni Kunhiraman.

The construction of the workshops and department blocks for engineering was completed in 1990. The complex was inaugurated by Sri. E.K. Nayanar (Chief Minister of Kerala) on 17 November 1990.

The main block was inaugurated on 1 June 1999 by Sri. P.J. Joseph, Minister for Education. All the classes were shifted to the new building. The new block has badminton courts and an open-air theatre.

Silver Jubilee 
GCEK celebrates its 25th anniversary during the year 2011–12. Silver Jubilee celebrations started with Xplore 2011, a national-level technical and cultural festival. On 22 January 2012, Sri James Mathew MLA laid the foundation stone of Silver Jubilee Gate sponsored by the Alumni association and PTA and is expected to finish by March 2012. The closing ceremony of Silver Jubilee was held in March 2012.

Notable alumni
 Byju Raveendran, Founder & CEO, Byju's The Learning App

See also
 College of Engineering, Thalassery
 Government Engineering College, Trivandrum
 List of colleges in Kerala
 APJ Abdul Kalam Technological University

References

External links

Silver Jubilee 
Alumni

Universities and colleges in Kannur district
Education in Kannur
Colleges affiliated to Kannur University
Dharmashala, Kannur
Educational institutions established in 1986
1986 establishments in Kerala
Engineering colleges in Kannur district